Ahmed Sary (Arabic أحمد ساري); (born August 20, 1968), is an Egyptian former football striker. He was the top scorer of Egyptian Premier League (1994–95) with 10 goals playing for Al Ittihad Al Sakandary. He is currently a manager for Al Ittihad Al Sakandary after short spills in Yemen and Sudan.

International career

Sary made some appearances for the Egypt national football team, including 1998 FIFA World Cup qualifying matches.

Titles and honours
 Top scorer in Egyptian Premier League (1994–95) with 10 goals.

References

External links
 
 
 

1968 births
Living people
Egyptian footballers
Egypt international footballers
Association football forwards
Sportspeople from Alexandria
Al Ittihad Alexandria Club players
Olympic Club (Egypt) players